The 1962 All-Pacific Coast football team consists of American football players chosen by various organizations for All-Pacific Coast teams for the 1962 NCAA University Division football season.

Selections

Backs
 Kermit Alexander, UCLA (AP-1)
 Terry Baker, Oregon State (AP-1)
 Ed Cummings, Stanford (AP-1)
 Mel Renfro, Oregon (AP-1)

Ends
 Hal Bedsole, USC (AP-1)
 Hugh Campbell, Washington State (AP-1)

Tackles
 Rod Scheyer, Washington (AP-1)
 Ron Snidow, Oregon (AP-1)

Guards
 Damon Bame, USC (AP-1)
 Mickey Ording, Oregon (AP-1)

Centers
 Ray Mansfield, Washington (AP-1)

Key
AP = Associated Press, selected from the seven members of the AP West Coast football board and AP sports writers

See also
1962 College Football All-America Team

References

All-Pacific Coast Football Team
All-Pacific Coast football teams
All-Pac-12 Conference football teams